Martin Drewes (20 October 1918 – 13 October 2013) was a German Luftwaffe military aviator and night fighter ace during World War II. He is credited with 52 victories of which 43 were claimed at night whilst flying variants of the Messerschmitt Bf 110 heavy fighter. The majority of his victories were claimed over the Western Front in Defence of the Reich missions against the Royal Air Force's Bomber Command.

Born in Lobmachtersen, Drewes grew up in the Weimar Republic and Nazi Germany. Following graduation from school, he joined the military service of the Army in 1937 and transferred to the Luftwaffe in 1939. He flew his first combat missions in early 1941. In May 1941, he participated in the Anglo-Iraqi War where he claimed his first aerial victory on 20 May 1941. In November 1941, Drewes transferred to the night fighter force, initially serving with Nachtjagdgeschwader 3 (NJG 3—3rd Night Fighter Wing). He claimed his first nocturnal aerial victory on the evening of 17 January 1943. In February 1943, Drewes was appointed Staffelkapitän (squadron leader) and transferred to Nachtjagdgeschwader 1 (NJG 1—1st Night Fighter Wing) in August 1943.

Early life
Drewes was born on 20 October 1918 in Lobmachtersen, at the time in the district of Wolfenbüttel, present day a borough of Salzgitter. He was the son of pharmacist Wilhelm Drewes and his wife Margarete, née Hayder, and had an older sister Hanna and a younger sister Käthe. Drewes passed his Abitur (School Leaving Certificate) at the Reformrealgymnsasium in Wolfenbüttel and joined the military service in the Army on 2 November 1937 as a Fahnenjunker. He initially served with Panzer-Regiment 6, a regiment of the 3rd Panzer Division, in Neuruppin and was posted to the Kriegsschule in Munich on 15 November 1938 as a Fähnrich. While stationed in Munich, Drewes befriended Chiang Wei-kuo, an adopted son of Republic of China President Chiang Kai-shek. In the Army, he commanded a PzKpfw I.

On 1 August 1939, Drewes was promoted to Leutnant (second lieutenant) and transferred to the Luftwaffe on 1 September. He was trained as a pilot, receiving his A/B-licenses in April 1940 at the Luftkriegsschule 3 (LKS 3—3rd air war school), Wildpark-West near Werder. On 1 May, his flight training progressed at the Flugzeugführerschule (C)5 where he received his C-Certificate on 30 August followed by attending the Blindflugschule 3 (3rd Blind Flying School) at Königsberg. On 16 October, he then trained as a Zerstörer (destroyer) pilot at the Zerstörerschule 1 (ZS 1—1st destroyer school) at Schleißheim near Munich.

World War II
World War II in Europe began on Friday, 1 September 1939, when German forces invaded Poland. On 8 February 1941, Drewes was posted to 4. Staffel (4th squadron) of Zerstörergeschwader 76 (ZG 76—76th Destroyer Wing). 4. Staffel was a squadron of II. Gruppe (2nd group) and was equipped with the Messerschmitt Bf 110 twin-engine heavy fighter, flying combat air patrols over the North Sea and German Bight.

II. Gruppe of ZG 76, also known as the "Shark Group" due to their distinct coloring scheme, was then transferred to Greece during the Balkans campaign. In May 1941, 4. Staffel of ZG 76 was order by Sonderkommando Junck (Special Force Junck), named after its commander Oberst Werner Junck and later renamed to Fliegerführer Irak (Flyer Command Iraq), to fly to Iraq. There, German forces under the cover name Special Staff F supported the Iraqi rebels during the Anglo-Iraqi War in their attempt to gain independence from the British Empire. In total, Drewes flew 36 combat missions, including 17 ground attack missions. On 20 May, he claimed his first aerial victory over a Royal Air Force (RAF) Gloster Gladiator biplane. His area of operations included Mosul, Kirkuk and lastly Aleppo, Syria. By 26 May, despite cannibalizing two machines damaged in a RAF raid on Mosul, no Bf 110 was left serviceable. That day, he was awarded the Iron Cross 2nd Class. Drewes, and two other pilots, was then flown to Rhodes, Greece on an Italian Savoia-Marchetti SM.79 medium bomber, tasked with bringing new aircraft to Iraq. The return flight never made it past Aleppo where the task force was ordered to retreat to Athens and then to Leeuwarden, Netherlands.

In mid-June 1941, 4. Staffel of ZG 76 was again flying patrols from Leeuwarden and De Kooy Airfield. Drewes received the Front Flying Clasp of the Luftwaffe in Silver on 2 July 1941. On 29 August, he claimed his second aerial victory over a Supermarine Spitfire shot down over the sea. Drewes was promoted to Oberleutnant (first lieutenant) on 1 November. His II. Gruppe of ZG 76 was then converted to a night fighter unit and renamed III. Gruppe of Nachtjagdgeschwader 3 (NJG 3—3rd Night Fighter Wing).

Night fighter career

Following the 1939 aerial Battle of the Heligoland Bight, RAF attacks shifted to the cover of darkness, initiating the Defence of the Reich campaign. By mid-1940, Generalmajor (Brigadier General) Josef Kammhuber had established a night air defense system dubbed the Kammhuber Line. It consisted of a series of control sectors equipped with radars and searchlights and an associated night fighter. Each sector named a Himmelbett (canopy bed) would direct the night fighter into visual range with target bombers. In 1941, the Luftwaffe started equipping night fighters with airborne radar such as the Lichtenstein radar. This airborne radar did not come into general use until early 1942.

In January 1942, III. Gruppe of NJG 3 moved from Stuttgart-Echterdingen to northern Germany, to airfields at Stade and Lüneburg. There, the unit was tasked with protecting Hamburg from air attacks. In February, Drewes flew missions in support of Operation Donnerkeil (11–13 February), an air superiority operation to support the Kriegsmarine (German Navy) Operation Cerberus. During the operation, the two battleships Scharnhorst and Gneisenau and the cruiser Prinz Eugen, docked in the port of Brest, successfully escaped from France and reached German ports. In the timeframe May to June 1943, he flew six specialized task force missions in Norway, including escort missions for the battleship Tirpitz and a transport for heavy water. Drewes claimed his first aerial victory as a night fighter pilot on the evening of 17 January 1943 when he shot down a Short Stirling bomber.

Staffelkapitän
In February 1943, Drewes was appointed Staffelkapitän (squadron leader) of 7. Staffel of NJG 3. At the time, this squadron was based at Copenhagen, Denmark. He claimed his second nocturnal aerial victory on over a Handley Page Halifax bomber in the vicinity of Store Heddinge on 14 March 1943. On 9 April, he was awarded the Iron Cross 1st Class.

For two months, Drewes was temporarily transferred to IV. Gruppe (4th group) of Nachtjagdgeschwader 1 (NJG 1—1st Night Fighter Wing) in June 1943. This Gruppe was based at Leeuwarden. On 15 August, the transfer was made permanent and Drewes was named Staffelkapitän of 11. Staffel, a squadron of IV. Gruppe of NJG 1. On 3 October 1943, his Bf 110 was hit by the return fire of Avro Lancaster bomber. The aircraft was severely damaged and burning, resulting in a forced landing at Allendorf-Haiger. Drewes claimed two Boeing B-17 Flying Fortress bombers shot down during daytime operations on 11 January 1944. For his previous achievements, he was awarded the German Cross in Gold on 24 February 1944.

Gruppenkommandeur
On 7 March, he was tasked with the leadership of III. Gruppe (3rd group) of NJG 1, becoming its acting Gruppenkommandeur (group commander). On 30/31 March 1944, Drewes claimed three Lancaster bombers shot down during the raid on Nuremberg. One of the aircraft shot down was Lancaster W5006 from No. 9 Squadron.

His adjutant in the group at the time was Oberleutnant Walter Scheel, who later became the President of West Germany (1 July 1974 – 30 June 1979). On the night of 21/22 July 1944, Drewes claimed two Lancaster bombers destroyed, but was also shot down in his Bf 110 G-4 (Werknummer 720410—factory number). Although Drewes was injured, he and his crew, Oberfeldwebel Georg "Schorsch" Petz and Oberfeldwebel Erich Handke, escaped by parachute.

At the end of hostilities he had flown 252 operations, and claimed a total of 52 victories (including a Spitfire, a Gladiator, seven American 4-engined bombers shot down in daylight operations, and 43 British bombers at night), most of them achieved with his crew, Petz and Handke. Drewes was decorated with Ritterkreuz and Eichenlaub. He was captured by British forces at the end of the war.

Later life
In February 1947, Drewes was released from captivity. He then left Germany, travelling to Italy. In Genua, he took the ship North King to Brazil, arriving in Rio de Janeiro on 20 August 1949. From 1950 to 1951, he worked as a pilot and aerial photography.
There he built a career as an entrepreneur and married Dulce Hurpia, a Brazilian woman, who gave him a son, Klaus Drewes, a lawyer in Brazil. The long marriage ended only in 2010 by the death of his wife. He returned at least once each year on visits to Germany. He died on 13 October 2013 in Blumenau, southern Brazil, of natural causes.

Summary of career

Aerial victory claims
Foreman, Parry and Mathews, authors of Luftwaffe Night Fighter Claims 1939 – 1945, researched the German Federal Archives and found records for 47 nocturnal victory claims, not documenting those aerial victories claimed as a Zerstörer pilot. Mathews and Foreman also published Luftwaffe Aces – Biographies and Victory Claims, listing Drewes with 45 claims, including one as a Zerstörer pilot, plus four further unconfirmed claims. According to Drewes' own account, three further B-17 bombers claimed, one on 19 May 1943 and two on 26 July 1943 respectively, were blocked by the Luftwaffe command chain and have not been documented.

Awards
 Iron Cross (1939)
 2nd Class (26 May 1941)
 1st Class (9 April 1943)
 Front Flying Clasp of the Luftwaffe for Night Fighters
 in Silver (2 July 1941)
 in Gold with Pennant "200" (18 January 1945)
 German Cross in Gold on 24 February 1944 as Oberleutnant in the 11./Nachtjagdgeschwader 1
 Honour Goblet of the Luftwaffe (Ehrenpokal der Luftwaffe) on 1 May 1944 as Oberleutnant and pilot
 Knight's Cross of the Iron Cross with Oak Leaves
 Knight's Cross on 27 July 1944 as Hauptmann and Gruppenkommandeur of the III./Nachtjagdgeschwader 1
 839th Oak Leaves on 17 April 1945 as Major and Gruppenkommandeur of the III./Nachtjagdgeschwader 1

Dates of rank

Notes

References

Citations

Bibliography

 
 
 
 
 
 
 
 
 
 
 
 Mauermann, Helmut (2005). Fliegerhorst Störmede. Eine Chronik in Bild und Wort. German language book of the base of III./NJG 1 December 1944 until March 1945, with a foreword of Martin Drewes
 
 
 
 
 
 
 

1918 births
2013 deaths
German World War II flying aces
Luftwaffe pilots
People from the Province of Hanover
Recipients of the Gold German Cross
Recipients of the Knight's Cross of the Iron Cross with Oak Leaves
People from Salzgitter
People from Blumenau
German Army (1935–1945) officers
Tank commanders
German emigrants to Brazil
Military personnel from Lower Saxony